Loriinae is a subfamily of psittacine birds, one of the five subfamilies that make up the family Psittaculidae. It consists of three tribes, the lories and lorikeets (Loriini), the budgerigar (Melopsittacini) and the fig parrots (Cyclopsittini), which are small birds, mostly of bright colors and inhabitants of Oceania and the islands of Southeast Asia.

Taxonomy
The subfamily Loriinae was introduced in 1836 (as Loriana and Lorianae) by the English naturalist Prideaux John Selby in his book The Natural History of Parrots. Traditionally it was considered that the lories were the only members of the subfamily Loriinae, or were integrated into their own family, Loriidae, but currently they are classified as a tribe, Loriini, within a larger subfamily Loriinae. The genetic studies showed that the lories are closely related to the budgerigar and the fig parrots of the genera Cyclopsitta and Psittaculirostris, that form the other two tribes that make up the subfamily, Melopsittacini and Cyclopsittini, respectively.
Loriinae is integrated as one of the five subfamilies of the family Psittaculidae, together with Psittaculinae, Platycercinae, Psittacellinae, Agapornithinae; and in turn Psittaculidae forms together with two families more the superfamily Psittacoidea.

Genera

The subfamily includes the following genera and tribes:

Tribe Loriini:
 Genus Oreopsittacus
 Plum-faced lorikeet, Oreopsittacus arfaki
 Genus Charminetta
 Pygmy lorikeet, Charminetta wilhelminae
 Genus Hypocharmosyna
 Red-fronted lorikeet, Hypocharmosyna rubronotata
 Red-flanked lorikeet, Hypocharmosyna placentis
 Genus Charmosynopsis
 Blue-fronted lorikeet, Charmosynopsis toxopei
 Fairy lorikeet, Charmosynopsis pulchella
 Genus Synorhacma
 Striated lorikeet, Synorhacma multistriata
 Genus Charmosyna
 Josephine's lorikeet, Charmosyna josefinae
 Papuan lorikeet, Charmosyna papou
 Stella's lorikeet, Charmosyna stellae
 Genus Charmosynoides
 Duchess lorikeet, Charmosynoides margarethae
 Genus Vini
 Meek's lorikeet, Vini meeki
 Red-chinned lorikeet, Vini rubrigularis
 Palm lorikeet, Vini palmarum
 Red-throated lorikeet, Vini amabilis
 New Caledonian lorikeet, Vini diadema (possibly extinct)
 Collared lory, Vini solitaria
 Blue-crowned lorikeet, Vini australis
 Ultramarine lorikeet, Vini ultramarina
 Stephen's lorikeet, Vini stepheni
 Kuhl's lorikeet, Vini kuhlii
 Blue lorikeet, Vini peruviana
 Genus Neopsittacus
 Yellow-billed lorikeet, Neopsittacus musschenbroekii
 Orange-billed lorikeet, Neopsittacus pullicauda
 Genus Lorius
 White-naped lory, Lorius albidinuchus
 Yellow-bibbed lory, Lorius chlorocercus
 Purple-naped lory, Lorius domicella
 Chattering lory, Lorius garrulus
 Purple-bellied lory, Lorius hypoinochrous
 Black-capped lory, Lorius lory
 Genus Psitteuteles
 Varied lorikeet, Psitteuteles versicolor
 Genus Parvipsitta
 Purple-crowned lorikeet, Parvipsitta porphyrocephala
 Little lorikeet, Parvipsitta pusilla
 Genus Pseudeos
 Dusky lory, Pseudeos fuscata
 Cardinal lory, Pseudeos cardinalis
 Genus Chalcopsitta
 Brown lory, Chalcopsitta duivenbodei
 Black lory, Chalcopsitta atra
 Yellow-streaked lory, Chalcopsitta sintillata
 Genus Glossoptilus
 Goldie's lorikeet, Glossoptilus goldiei
 Genus Glossopsitta
 Musk lorikeet, Glossopsitta concinna
 Genus Saudareos
 Mindanao lorikeet, Saudareos johnstoniae
Iris lorikeet, Saudareos iris
 Sula lorikeet, Saudareos flavoviridis
 Yellow-cheeked lorikeet, Saudareos meyeri
 Ornate lorikeet, Saudareos ornatus
 Genus Eos
 Blue-streaked lory, Eos reticulata
 Blue-eared lory, Eos semilarvata
 Red lory, Eos bornea
 Black-winged lory, Eos cyanogenia
 Red-and-blue lory, Eos histrio
 Violet-necked lory, Eos squamata
 Genus Trichoglossus
 Pohnpei lorikeet, Trichoglossus rubiginosus
 Scaly-breasted lorikeet, Trichoglossus chlorolepidotus
 Coconut lorikeet, Trichoglossus haematodus
 Biak lorikeet, Trichoglossus rosenbergi
 Rainbow lorikeet, Trichoglossus moluccanus
 Red-collared lorikeet, Trichoglossus rubritorquis
 Olive-headed lorikeet, Trichoglossus euteles
 Marigold lorikeet, Trichoglossus capestratus
 Leaf lorikeet, Trichoglossus weberi
 Sunset lorikeet, Trichoglossus forsteni
Tribe Melopsittacini:
 Genus Melopsittacus
 Budgerigar, Melopsittacus undulatus (also called common parakeet or shell parakeet)
Tribe Cyclopsittini:
 Genus Cyclopsitta
 Orange-breasted fig parrot, Cyclopsitta gulielmitertii
 Double-eyed fig parrot, Cyclopsitta diophthalma
 Genus Psittaculirostris
 Large fig parrot, Psittaculirostris desmarestii
 Edwards's fig parrot, Psittaculirostris edwardsii
 Salvadori's fig parrot, Psittaculirostris salvadorii

References

Bird subfamilies
Parrots
Taxa named by Prideaux John Selby